Moara may refer to:

Places
Moara, Burkina Faso
Moara, Suceava, Romania
Moara, Puchenii Mari, Prahova County, Romania

Rivers
 Moara (Siret), Romania

See also

 Morar (disambiguation)
 Moraru (disambiguation)